Toni Vitali (born 14 January 1991) is a Croatian professional basketball player for Högsbo in the Swedish second league, Superettan.

References

External links
 Eurobasket Profile
 RealGM Profile

1991 births
Living people
Borås Basket players
Croatian men's basketball players
GKK Šibenik players
KK Cedevita players
KK Zagreb players
Power forwards (basketball)
People from Trogir
KK Alkar players